This is a timeline documenting events of Jazz in the year 1993.

Events

April
 10 – The 20th Vossajazz started in Voss, Norway (April 10–12).

June
 2 – The 21st Nattjazz started in Bergen, Norway (June 2–13).
 5 – The 22nd Moers Festival started in Moers, Germany (June 5–8).
 29 – The 14th Montreal International Jazz Festival started in Montreal, Quebec, Canada (June 29 – July 9).

July
 1 – The 3rd Jazz Fest Wien started in Wien, Austria (July 1 – 15).
 2
 The 16th Copenhagen Jazz Festival started in Copenhagen, Denmark (July 2–11).
 The 27th Montreux Jazz Festival started in Montreux, Switzerland (July 2–17).
 10
 The 18th North Sea Jazz Festival started in The Hague (July 10–12).
 The 28th Pori Jazz started in Pori, Finland (July 10 – 18).
 13 – The 34th Moldejazz started in Molde, Norway (July 13 – 18).

August
 13 – The 10th Brecon Jazz Festival started in Brecon, Wales (April 13–15).

September
 17 – The 36th Monterey Jazz Festival started in Monterey, California (September 17–19).

Album releases

Franz Koglmann: Cantos I-IV
Bill Dixon: Vade Mecum
Marilyn Crispell: Santuerio
George E. Lewis: Voyager
Matthew Shipp: Prism
Zeena Parkins: Isabelle
Pat Metheny Group: The Road to You – Live in Europe
Bobby Previte: Hue And Cry
Marty Ehrlich: Can You Hear A Motion
Music Revelation Ensemble: In The Name Of
Henry Threadgill: Too Much Sugar for a Dime
Dave Douglas: Parallel Worlds
Wynton Marsalis: In This House, On This Morning
Ken Vandermark: Big Head Eddie
Charles Gayle: Consecration
Greg Osby: 3D Lifestyles
Mulgrew Miller: With Our Own Eyes
John Scofield: Hand Jive
Steve Coleman: Tao of Mad Phat
James Ulmer: Harmolodic Guitar with Strings
Irene Schweizer: Les Diaboliques
Evan Parker: Synergetics – Phonomanie III
David Liebman: The Seasons
Chick Corea Elektric Band II: Paint the World
Marcus Miller: The Sun Don't Lie
Joe Maneri: Dahabenzapple
Joey Baron: Raised Pleasure Dot
Joshua Redman: Joshua Redman
Cecil Taylor: Always a Pleasure
Charlie Hunter: Trio
Lyle Mays Trio: Fictionary
Gerry Hemingway: Demon Chaser
Jessica Williams: Next Step
Roger Neumann: Instant Heat
Yosuke Yamashita: Kurdish Dance
Tom Harrell: Upswing
Ray Anderson: Big Band Record
Arturo Sandoval: Danzon
Michael Franks: Dragonfly Summer
David S. Ware: Third Ear Recitation
Eliane Elias: Paulistana

Deaths

 January
 6 – Dizzy Gillespie, American trumpeter, bandleader, and composer (born 1917).
 23
 Charles Greenlee, American trombonist (born 1927).
 Thomas A. Dorsey, American pianist and band leader (born 1899).
 27 – Eddie Calhoun, American upright bassist (born 1921).
 30 – Ryoichi Hattori, Japanese composer (born 1907).

 February
 14 – Elek Bacsik, Hungarian-born American violinist and guitarist (born 1926).
 15 – George Wallington, American pianist and composer (born 1924).
 17 – Sammy Lowe, American trumpeter, arranger and conductor (born 1918).
 24 – Gene Porter, American saxophonist and clarinetist (born 1910).

 March
 3 – Harper Goff, American artist, musician, and actor (born 1911).
 4 – Art Hodes, American pianist (born 1904).
 8
 Billy Eckstine, American singer (born 1914).
 Singleton Palmer, American multi-instrumentalist and bandleader (born 1913).
 9 – Bob Crosby, American bandleader and singer (born 1913).
 15 – Gene Leis, American guitarist and bandleader (born 1920).
 25 – Jake Porter, American trumpeter and record producer (born 1916).
 27 – Clifford Jordan, American saxophonist (born 1931).

 April
 3 – Herman Fowlkes Jr., American musician and educator (born 1919).

 May
 22 – Juice Wilson, American violinist (born 1904).
 30 – Sun Ra, American composer, bandleader, and pianist (born 1914).

 June
 5 – Dupree Bolton, American trumpeter (born 1929).
 7 – Louie Ramirez, American percussionist, and vibraphonist (born 1938).
 16 – Lebert Lombardo, Canadian-American trumpeter and singer (born 1905).
 21 – Al Fairweather, British trumpeter (born 1927).
 22 – Emmett Berry, American trumpeter (born 1915).
 25 – Rich Matteson, American musician and collegiate music educator (born 1929).

 July
 11 – Mario Bauza, Afro-Cuban clarinetist, saxophonist, and trumpeter (born 1911).
 12 – John Jenkins, American saxophonist (born 1931).
 22
 Art Porter Sr., American pianist (born 1934).
 Leon "Pee Wee" Whittaker, African American trombonist (born 1906).
 30 – Don Myrick, American saxophonist, The Pharaohs (born 1940).

 August
 1
 Bob Carter, American bassist and arranger (born 1922).
 Max Jones, British jazz author, radio host, and journalist (born 1917).
 4 – Kenny Drew, American pianist (born 1928).
 5 – Bob Cooper, American West Coast saxophonist (born 1925).
 10 – Eva Olmerová, Czech singer (born 1934).

 September
 6 – Bjarne Liller, Danish singer-songwriter (born 1935).
 7 – Adele Girard, American harpist (born 1913).
 9 – Jimmy Deuchar, Scottish trumpeter and big band arranger (born 1930).
 13 – Steve Jordan, American guitarist (born 1919.
 16 – J. R. Monterose, American saxophonist (born 1927).
 17 – Elmer Crumbley, American trombonist (born 1908).
 27 – Fraser MacPherson, Canadian saxophonist (born 1928).

 October
 2 – Ahmed Abdul-Malik, American upright bassist and oud player (born 1927).
 9 – Greely Walton, American tenor saxophonist (born 1904).

 November
 7 – Adelaide Hall, American-born UK-based singer (born 1901).
 8 – Dick Cathcart, American trumpeter (born 1924).
 11 – Erskine Hawkins, American trumpet player and big band leader (born 1914).
 17 – Teddy Powell, American guitarist, composer, and big band leader (born 1905).
 28 – Bruce Turner, English saxophonist, clarinetist, and bandleader (born 1922).
 29 – Alan Clare, British jazz pianist (born 1921).

 December
 4 – Frank Zappa, American guitarist, composer, and band leader (born 1940),
 9 – Carter Jefferson, American tenor saxophonist (born 1946).
 25 – Ann Ronell, American composer and lyricist (born 1905).

Births

 April
 19 – Arianna Neikrug, American singer, songwriter, and arranger.

 September
 24 – Narelle Kheng, Singaporean percussionist and vocalist.

 November
 21 – Fredrik Halland, Norwegian singer, songwriter, guitarist, and music producer.

 Unknown date
 Alice Phoebe Lou, South African singer and songwriter residing in Berlin.
 Arne Martin Nybo, Norwegian guitarist.
 Rohey Taalah, Norwegian singer and songwriter.

See also

 1990s in jazz
 List of years in jazz
 1993 in music

References

External links 
 History Of Jazz Timeline: 1993 at All About Jazz

Jazz
Jazz by year